Bradley Hall (born 16 November 1990) is a British bobsledder. He competed in the two-man event and the four-man event at both the 2018 Winter Olympics and the 2022 Winter Olympics.

His 2nd place finish in the 2-man race at Igls in January was the first medal for a British sled in the event in more than 30 years and his joint 4th in the 2-man World Championships in Whistler in 2019 was the best British result in 53 years.

Career results

Olympic Games

World Championships

* as a brakeman

** crash at the second run

*** DNS at the third run

Bobsleigh World Cup

Two-man

Four-man

References

External links
 
Team Bobsleigh Brad
Brad Hall bio at the British Bobsleigh & Skeleton Association

1990 births
Living people
Sportspeople from Crawley
Sportspeople from West Sussex
British male bobsledders
Olympic bobsledders of Great Britain
Bobsledders at the 2018 Winter Olympics
Bobsledders at the 2022 Winter Olympics